The Rugby League Four Nations final is the championship game in the Rugby League Four Nations tournament. The tournament consists of four international teams that play each other once in a league table. The top two teams at the end of the six group games then play each other again for the championship.  

The tournament has been played five times with each ending in a final game. Three have taken place in England, one in Australia and one in New Zealand. Out of the three finals in England, two of the finals have both taken part at the same stadium, Elland Road, Leeds; these two finals have seen England take part but lose both games to Australia. The other English final was held at Anfield, Liverpool, which saw Australia defeat New Zealand in 2016. The two finals to take place in Oceania have both been won by New Zealand against Australia, with the first in 2010 being at Suncorp Stadium, Brisbane, and the second in 2014 being won on home soil at Westpac Stadium, Wellington. As a result, this is the only time that a host nation has won the tournament on home soil. As of 2016, no fourth nation has reached the final.

Finals

Venues
Leeds' Elland Road has hosted the most finals with the venue being used twice. The Suncorp Stadium in Brisbane, Australia holds the record for the highest attendance with 36,299 spectators watching the 2010 final.

References

Rugby League Tri-Nations
Rugby League Four Nations
Rugby league matches